Artashat orthonairovirus, also called Artashat virus (ARTSV), is a species in the genus Orthonairovirus. It was first isolated in Armenia in 1972 from Ornithodoros alactagalis, a soft tick of the family Argasidae.

References

Nairoviridae